Oshiwara is a neighbourhood in northern Mumbai, India near Lokhandwala Complex. Its name was derived from the Oshiwara River. Located between the western sides of Goregaon and Jogeshwari, it has many industrial estates. A railway station was built at Oshiwara, called Ram Mandir, for the Western Line of Mumbai Suburban Railway, providing service to the extended Andheri and Lokhandwala areas of the western suburbs. Oshiwara is also known for its antique and second-hand furniture market, as well as its food corners.

Brihanmumbai Electricity Supply and Transport operates a bus depot at Oshiwara.

References

Neighbourhoods in Mumbai